Morten Bjørlo (born 4 October 1995) is a Norwegian footballer who plays as a midfielder for Rosenborg.

Career
In January 2021, he joined HamKam on a two-year contract. On 2 April 2022, he made his Eliteserien debut in a 2–2 draw against Lillestrøm.

In December 2022, he signed for Rosenborg on a free transfer starting from January 2023.

References

External links

1995 births
Living people
People from Strand, Norway
Association football midfielders
Norwegian footballers
Staal Jørpeland IL players
Sola FK players
Egersunds IK players
Nest-Sotra Fotball players
Strømmen IF players
Hamarkameratene players
Norwegian Third Division players
Norwegian Second Division players
Norwegian First Division players
Eliteserien players
Sportspeople from Rogaland